Mabel Lucy Matthews AIEE (née Hanlon) (25 May 1879 – 2 February 1970) was a British electrical and production engineer, instigator of idea for the Electrical Association for Women.

Biography
Matthews was born Mabel Lucy Hanlon in Wakefield on 25 May 1879. Matthews grew up in Yorkshire and Cheshire. Her father was a Chelsea Pensioner and she was his second daughter.  His position meant he later worked as the gatekeeper for various government departments in Whitehall. She married Richard Matthews in 1901 and they lived in Barrow-in-Furness where he worked as a company secretary. He died in 1909 and Matthews moved to live mostly with her parents and sister, living in Burlington House Piccadilly. She took clerical work and began working for a paper makers’ engineering company.

Consolidated Pneumatic Tool Co Ltd 
By 1923 Matthews was in charge of the Electrical department of the Consolidated Pneumatic Tool Co Ltd. The company factory was in Scotland but their head office was in The Egyptian Building in Piccadilly. Matthews went on to become the manager of the company. She was not known to have any formal engineering qualifications. But by 1923 she had enough technical experience to get graduate membership of the Institute of Electrical Engineers. She became an Associate in 1930. She gave the company presentations and talks on the specialist equipment on coalmining drills and welding. Matthews was a very early member of the Women's Engineering Society, (founded in 1919) giving talks to the membership as early as 1922.

Electrical Association for Women 
Matthews suggested a scheme to popularise the domestic use of electricity in 1924. She talked about getting the idea because of a conversation about hard work while working on a farm during the war. Most people didn't know how to use the electric appliances that were only newly being brought to all parts of the UK. Matthews presented the idea to the Institute of Electrical Engineers in her associate requirement paper, but they turned the proposal down, as did the Electrical Development Association, (formed in 1919) stating that they felt the time was not ripe for such an organisation.

Matthews next approached Caroline Haslett, Secretary of the Women's Engineering Society (WES). Haslett's reaction was very enthusiastic and she took it to the then President of WES, Lady Katharine Parsons, who was less enthusiastic but was persuaded to give the idea her support. A meeting was set up for the 12th November 1924, at the London home of Lady Parsons, with attendees made up of leading figures in the world of engineering and women's organisations, including Sir Charles Parsons, Lord Headley, Sir Alfred Yarrow, Mr. F. S. Button, Mr J. Beauchamp (Director of EDA), Mr B. Llewelyn Atkinson (Cable Makers Association), Margaret Partridge (WES member, electrical engineer and company director), Miss T. J. Dillon and Miss Hilda Shaw from the world of domestic science, Miss B. J. Lanfear of the Incorporated Municipal Electrical Association, with representatives from the Girl Guides, the Women's Co-operative Guild, the Garden Cities and Town Planning Association, the Headmistresses’ Association; the National Union of Women Teachers, the National Council of Women and the National Women Citizens’ Association. Mrs Matthews read her paper to the meeting.

What was termed "a lively discussion" followed Matthew's speech and the meeting ended with a resolution, proposed by Margaret Partridge and agreed unanimously “…to form a Women’s Electrical Association” and wishing “to put on record its thanks to Mrs Matthews”.

The Women's Electrical Association was formally established in December 1924, with Haslett as its first Director. The name was soon changed to the Electrical Association for Women (EAW) in early 1925 to avoid confusion with the acronym of the Workers’ Educational Association

Matthews was also a vice president of the EAW, which finally closed up in 1986, once the objectives were met. Matthews retired about 1940, and was living in Herne Hill at the end of her life. She died on 2 February 1970 in Camberwell.

References and sources

1879 births
1970 deaths
People from Wakefield
British women engineers
English electrical engineers
Women's Engineering Society